The Talladega-Sylacauga Micropolitan Statistical Area is a micropolitan statistical area that consisted of two counties in Alabama, anchored by the cities of Talladega and Sylacauga, as defined by the United States Census Bureau and the United States Office of Management and Budget. The area is also included in the Birmingham-Hoover-Talladega, Alabama Combined Statistical Area. As of the 2010 census, the μSA had a population of 93,830.

In 2013, the United States Office of Management and Budget added Coosa County to the micropolitan statistical area; it was previously part of the now-defunct Alexander City micropolitan area.

Counties
Coosa
Talladega

Communities
Places with more than 10,000 inhabitants
Oxford (part)
Sylacauga (Principal City)
Talladega (Principal City)
Places with 5,000 to 10,000 inhabitants
Childersburg
Lincoln
Places with 1,000 to 5,000 inhabitants
Goodwater
Munford
Vincent (part)
Places with less than 1,000 inhabitants
Bon Air
Kellyton
Oak Grove
Rockford
Talladega Springs
Waldo

Demographics

See also
Alabama census statistical areas

References

Geography of Talladega County, Alabama
Geography of Coosa County, Alabama
Micropolitan areas of Alabama